Crane Hill is a mountain located in the Catskill Mountains of New York southwest of Walton. Walton Mountain is located northwest, South Mountain is located east, and Bear Spring Mountain is located east of Crane Hill.

References

Mountains of Delaware County, New York
Mountains of New York (state)